Lauren Cheney Holiday (born Lauren Nicole Cheney; September 30, 1987) is an American former professional soccer player who played as a midfielder and forward for the United States women's national football team from 2007 to 2015. She is a two-time Olympic gold medalist and FIFA Women's World Cup champion. Holiday played professionally for FC Kansas City in the National Women's Soccer League (NWSL) and the Boston Breakers in the Women's Professional Soccer (WPS). She played collegiate soccer for the UCLA Bruins.

Holiday won gold with the national team at the 2008 Beijing Summer Olympics, 2012 London Summer Olympics, and the 2015 FIFA Women's World Cup in Canada. She played for the team at the 2011 FIFA Women's World Cup where the U.S. finished in second place and Holiday was named to the tournament's All-Star team.

In 2007, she was named U.S. Soccer Young Female Athlete of the Year. She earned U.S. Soccer Female Athlete of the Year honors in 2014. She was the first player in NWSL history to have her jersey retired after retiring from the league.

Early life
Born in Indianapolis, Indiana to Rita and George Cheney, Holiday began playing soccer as a youth after watching her brother play the sport. She played on boys' teams until age 12. She attended Ben Davis High School in Indianapolis where she was named the school's most valuable offensive player in 2004–05. In 2004, she was named Metro Player of the Year by the Indianapolis Star. In 2006, she was named Parade All-American and was Gatorade Player of the Year in addition to receiving numerous regional awards including first-team All-Conference, All-County and All-State, and Indianapolis Star Super Team Player of the Year. She earned Indiana All-State selection honors each year of her high school career and was named NSCAA All-American three times. Holiday finished her high school career having scored 118 goals and served 67 assists. She graduated mid-year in 2006 to train full-time with the United States U-20 women's national soccer team for the FIFA U-20 Women's World Cup.

UCLA Bruins, 2006–2009
In the fall of 2006, Holiday enrolled at UCLA, where she was named a first-team All-American and NSCAA Freshman of the Year. She led the Pac-10 Conference with 19 goals, which also set a new UCLA freshman record with a goals-per-game percentage of .95. As a sophomore in 2007, she was the runner-up for the women's Hermann Trophy and the Pac-10 Player of the Year. She led the conference again in goals scored with 23 and broke the UCLA single-season school records for points (57) and goals (23).

Holiday became the first player in UCLA history to earn NSCAA/adidas First-Team All-America honors all four years of her career. At UCLA, she set new school records for points (173) and game-winning goals (28); and tied the career school record in goals with 71. She had 31 career assists, second place in the record book. During her four years, the Bruins played in consecutive NCAA College Cups.

Playing career

Club

Pali Blues, 2009
During the summer of 2009, Holiday joined Southern California team Pali Blues, in the W-League. Throughout the entire regular season, the Blues did not lose a match and finished first in the Western Conference with a 9–0–3 record. After defeating the Hudson Valley Quickstrike Lady Blues 4–0 in the championship semi-final in which Holiday scored a goal in the 65th minute, the Pali Blues clinched the championship title in a 2–1 defeat of the Washington Freedom Reserves on August 7, 2009.

Boston Breakers, 2010–2011
 On January 15, 2010, Holiday was selected by the Boston Breakers as the second overall pick in the WPS Draft. She played in 23 games for Boston during the 2010 season, starting in 21 matches and scoring five goals with two assists. Holiday scored the team's lone goal in the 2–1 playoff loss against the Philadelphia Independence. Holiday was named as a starter in the 2010 WPS All-Star Game and scored in the 79th minute.

During the 2011 WPS season, Holiday made ten appearances for the club. After returning to Boston following the 2011 FIFA Women's World Cup, Holiday's brace during the team's final regular season match helped the Breakers clinch the last remaining spot in the playoffs. She was subsequently named WPS Player of the Week for week 18 of the season. The Breakers finished the regular season in fourth place with a  The team was defeated 3–1 by magicJack during the playoff semifinal.

FC Kansas City, 2013–2015
In 2013, Holiday was one of three national team players along with Becky Sauerbrunn and Nicole Barnhart to be allocated to FC Kansas City for the inaugural season of the National Women's Soccer League as part of the NWSL Player Allocation. In June 2013, she was named NWSL Player of the Month after scoring six times in five games and becoming the league's leading scorer with eight goals. FC Kansas City finished second during the regular season with an 11–6–5 record. The team advanced to the playoffs but were defeated 2–3 by Portland Thorns FC during the semi-finals. Following the 2013 NWSL season, Holiday was awarded the Golden Boot, an award given to the player who scores the most goals (12) and was named the league's Most Valuable Player (MVP).

In 2014 NWSL season, FC Kansas City finished the regular season in second place, with Holiday providing a team-leading 7 assists, and finished second in goals scored with 8 behind Amy Rodriguez's 13.
In the post-season playoffs, Holiday scored the second goal in a 2–0 victory over the Portland Thorns FC in the semi final, and provided both the assists for Rodriguez's two goals, as they beat Seattle Reign FC 2–1 in the 2014 Championship game, to clinch the club's first NWSL title. Holiday was voted the match's MVP.

As of 2015, Holiday was the leading goal scorer (20) and assist leader (12) all-time in the NWSL. She retired from the NWSL at the end of the 2015 season as Kansas City repeated as champions, allowing Holiday to retire holding world and league titles. Her number 12 jersey was retired in her honour.

International

Holiday made her first appearance and start for the U.S. women's national soccer team on January 26, 2007, against Germany. She earned her second cap and scored her first goals against Mexico on April 14, 2007. The same year, she was named the U.S. Soccer Young Female Athlete of the Year.

2008 Beijing Olympics 
Holiday was named to the U.S. roster for the 2008 Summer Olympics in Beijing after Abby Wambach was forced to withdraw with a broken leg. She appeared in three games as a substitute  helping the U.S. win gold at the tournament. In 2010, Holiday was the second-leading scorer on the team with seven goals in 13 total matches, starting seven.

2011 FIFA Women's World Cup 
2011 saw the U.S. team making preparations for the 2011 FIFA Women's World Cup and training starting with the Four Nations Tournament in January. Holiday scored her 12th international goal during the U.S.' 2–1 win over Canada. The U.S. defeated China 2–0 in the final to clinch the tournament title. At the 2011 Algarve Cup in March, she scored a goal against Iceland during the final helping the U.S. win 4–2 and clinch their 8th title at the tournament.

Holiday started in all six 2011 FIFA Women's World Cup matches, scoring two goals and leading the team with three assists. Her performance earned a spot on the Women's World Cup All-Star Team. Holiday scored the first tournament goal for the U.S. during the team's first group stage against North Korea on June 28 helping the U.S. win 2–0. During the team's next group stage match against Colombia, Cheney served the assist to Megan Rapinoe's first World Cup goal who had just subbed into the match. It was the quickest goal for a U.S. substitute in history of the tournament. Despite losing to Sweden 2–1 during the team's third group stage match, the U.S. advanced to the knockout stage where they faced Brazil on July 10. The U.S. won the dramatic match after equalizing the match in the 120th minute and winning 5–3 in the resulting penalty kick shootout. During the semi-final match against France on July 13, Holiday scored the game-opening goal in the ninth minute. In the 79th minute, her cross to Abby Wambach lifted the score to 2–1 and an eventual 3–1 win to advance to the World Cup final against Japan. In front of a sell-out crowd of 48,817, the United States tied Japan 1–1 during regulation time and 2–2 in overtime advancing to a penalty kick shootout where they were defeated. Despite spraining an ankle early in the first half of the match, Holiday continued playing until being subbed off at the start of the second half.

2012 London Olympics 
Holiday led the United States team with seven assists in five games at the 2012 CONCACAF Women's Olympic Qualifying Tournament in Vancouver, British Columbia including four assists during the U.S.' 14–0 rout of the Dominican Republic. She played in all six games at the 2012 Summer Olympics, starting five. She came off the bench in the gold medal match to play the final 23 minutes after suffering a minor injury in the semifinal.

2015 FIFA Women's World Cup 
In 2015, Holiday scored the third goal of the 2015 FIFA Women's World Cup Final in the 14th minute of the game helping the U.S. defeat previous World Cup champions Japan 5–2.

On July 7, 2015, following the 2015 FIFA Women's World Cup, Holiday announced her retirement from her international career.

Career statistics

International goals

Honors and awards

International
 Olympic Gold Medal: 2008, 2012
 FIFA Women's World Cup: 2015	
 Algarve Cup: 2008, 2010, 2011, 2013, 2015
 CONCACAF Women's Olympic Qualifying Tournament: 2008, 2012
CONCACAF Women's Championship: 2014
 Four Nations Tournament: 2007, 2008, 2011

Individual
 FIFA Women's World Cup All-Star Team: 2011
 WPS All-Star: 2010	
 NWSL Best XI: 2013, 2014
 NWSL Most Valuable Player: 2013
 NWSL Golden Boot: 2013
 NWSL Championship Game MVP: 2014
 U.S. Soccer Young Female Athlete of the Year: 2007
 NCAA All-American First-Team: 2006, 2007, 2008, 2009
 Pac-10 Conference Player of the Year: 2007
 Soccer America Player of the Year Award: 2007
 U.S. Soccer Female Athlete of the Year: 2014
 Sagamore of the Wabash: 2015
National Soccer Hall of Fame: 2023

Team
with FC Kansas City
 NWSL championship: 2014, 2015

Personal life
At the age of three, Holiday had open heart surgery to correct a heart defect. She married professional basketball player Jrue Holiday, fellow former UCLA Bruin and NBA point guard, on July 7, 2013. The two first met and began dating in 2008 while they were both attending UCLA.

Holiday is a Christian.

On September 4, 2016, it was announced that Holiday had previously been diagnosed with a brain tumor during her pregnancy. Her husband chose to take a leave of absence to care for her. The tumor, which was benign, was found on the right side of her brain in late June 2016. Holiday gave birth to Jrue Tyler Holiday, a baby girl in September 2016, and the tumor was successfully removed in October. She gave birth to a son, Hendrix, in 2020.

Holiday has signed endorsement deals with Under Armour and Chobani.

In popular culture

Video games
Holiday was featured along with her national teammates in the EA Sports' FIFA video game series in FIFA 16, the first time women players were included in the game.

Ticker tape parade and White House honor
Following the United States' win at the 2015 FIFA Women's World Cup, Holiday and her teammates became the first women's sports team to be honored with a ticker tape parade in New York City. Each player received a key to the city from Mayor Bill de Blasio. In October of the same year, the team was honored by President Barack Obama at the White House.

See also
 List of American and Canadian soccer champions
 List of Olympic medalists in football
 List of footballers with 100 or more caps
 List of UCLA alumni

References

Match reports

Further reading
 Grainey, Timothy (2012), Beyond Bend It Like Beckham: The Global Phenomenon of Women's Soccer, University of Nebraska Press, 
 Lisi, Clemente A. (2010), The U.S. Women's Soccer Team: An American Success Story, Scarecrow Press, 
 Nash, Tim (2016), It's Not the Glory: The Remarkable First Thirty Years of U S Women's Soccer, Lulu Press Inc, 
 Stevens, Dakota (2011), A Look at the Women's Professional Soccer Including the Soccer Associations, Teams, Players, Awards, and More, BiblioBazaar,

External links

 
 US Soccer player profile
 FC Kansas City player profile
 UCLA player profile

Living people
1987 births
United States women's international soccer players
UCLA Bruins women's soccer players
Footballers at the 2008 Summer Olympics
Footballers at the 2012 Summer Olympics
Olympic gold medalists for the United States in soccer
American women's soccer players
Pali Blues players
Soccer players from Indianapolis
Boston Breakers players
Footballers at the 2007 Pan American Games
2011 FIFA Women's World Cup players
2015 FIFA Women's World Cup players
National Women's Soccer League players
FC Kansas City players
Medalists at the 2012 Summer Olympics
Medalists at the 2008 Summer Olympics
FIFA Century Club
FIFA Women's World Cup-winning players
People with congenital heart defects
Women's association football midfielders
Women's association football forwards
Pan American Games silver medalists for the United States
United States women's under-20 international soccer players
Pan American Games medalists in football
Medalists at the 2007 Pan American Games
Women's Professional Soccer players